Mozart Gurgel Valente Júnior (November 11, 1917 in Rio de Janeiro – December 19, 1970 in Washington, DC) was a Brazilian diplomat, Ambassador to the United States  (February to December 1970).

Life 

Mozart Gurgel Valente Junior was the son of Maria José Ferreira de Souza and Mozart Gurgel Valente. His mother's brother was Glauco Ferreira de Souza, ambassador in La Paz from 25 October 1958 to his death there 21 March 1959. Valente has two brothers, Murillo Gurgel Valente and Maury Gurgel Valente.

Beginning in 1942 he was vice-consul to Morris Llewellyn Cooke on an American technical mission to Brazil. And two years later, he found himself in Algiers. On 19 January 1970 he was appointed ambassador in Washington, D.C., where he was accredited on 20 February 1970. He died on 19 December 1970.

References 

1917 births
1970 deaths
Brazilian diplomats
People from Rio de Janeiro (city)
Ambassadors of Brazil to the United States
Brazilian expatriates in Algeria